PGIA may refer to:
 N,N'-diacetylbacillosaminyl-diphospho-undecaprenol alpha-1,3-N-acetylgalactosaminyltransferase, an enzyme
 Postgraduate Institute of Agriculture